SciCrunch is a collaboratively edited knowledge base about scientific resources. It is a community portal for researchers and a content management system for data and databases. It is intended to provide a common source of data to the research community and the data about Research Resource Identifiers (RRIDs), which can be used in scientific publications. After starting as a pilot of two journals in 2014, by 2022 over 1,000 journals have been using them and over half a million RRIDs have been quoted in the scientific literature. In some respect, it is for science and scholarly publishing, similar to what Wikidata is for Wikimedia Foundation projects. Hosted by the University of California, San Diego, SciCrunch was also designed to help communities of researchers create their own portals to provide access to resources, databases and tools of relevance to their research areas

Research Resource Identifiers 

Research Resource Identifiers (RRID) are supposed to be resource identifiers which are globally unique and persistent.
They were introduced and are promoted by the Resource Identification Initiative.
Resources in this context are research resources like reagents, tools or materials.
An example for such a resource would be a cell line used in an experiment or software tool used in a computational analysis.
The Resource Identification Portal (https://scicrunch.org/resources) was created in support of this initiative and is a central service where these identifiers can be searched and created. These identifiers should be fully searchable by data mining unlike supplementary files, and can be updated to new versions as basic methodology changes over time.

Format for RRID citations 

The recommendation for citing research resources is shown below for key biological resources:
 Antibody: Millipore Cat# MAB377 (Lot) RRID:AB_2298772
 Model organism: NXR Cat# 1.0049, RRID:NXR_1.0049
 Cell line: Coriell Cat# GM03745, RRID:CVCL_1H60
 Tools: CellProfiler Image Analysis Software, (version or date) RRID:SCR_007358

The Resource Identification Portal lists existing RRIDs and instructions for creating a new one if an RRID matching the resource does not already exist.

Institutions and publishers recommending use of RRIDs 

A number of publishing houses, initiatives, and research institutions encourage using SciCrunch‘s RRIDs:
Common Citation Format Article in Nature, Cell Press, eLife, FORCE11, Frontiers Media,
GigaScience,
MIRIAM Registry,
NIH,
PLOS Biology and PLOS Genetics.

See also
 LSID
 Resource Description Framework
 Tag (metadata)

References

External links
 
 full list of institutes and publishers
 RRID Resolver
 Know More About SciCrunch and RRIDs: An Interview with Dr. Anita Bandrowski

Bioinformatics
Identifiers
Index (publishing)
Knowledge bases
Online databases